Eugene Gladstone O'Neill Jr. (May 5, 1910 – September 25, 1950) was an American professor of Greek literature and the only child of Nobel Prize-winning playwright Eugene O'Neill and his first wife, Kathleen Jenkins.

Early life
O'Neill Jr.'s parents divorced in 1912, when he was a toddler.  O'Neill once said he did not even meet his father until age 12. He entered Yale in 1928; in his freshman year a poem he had written was widely reprinted. He graduated Phi Beta Kappa from Yale in 1932, where he was a member of Skull and Bones secret student society. 
After studying abroad for a year, he earned a PhD in philosophy from Yale in 1936.

Career
As a classicist and philosophy scholar, O'Neill taught at Yale, Princeton, Fordham University, Sarah Lawrence College, and the New School for Social Research. He was the editor of a collection of Greek plays; shortly before his death he had contributed book reviews to The New York Times and the Saturday Review of Literature, and also been featured on the CBS radio show, "Invitation to Learning".

Personal life and death
O'Neill married in 1931, to Elizabeth Green; this marriage ended in divorce after six years. He married secondly Sarah Hayward in 1939, whom he divorced after seven years. He then remarried a third time, to Janet Hunter Longley. O'Neill abused alcohol, as did his father and grandfather. On September 25, 1950, in Woodstock, he committed suicide at age 40 by slitting his wrist and ankle with a razor. He then walked downstairs and expired by the front door of his cottage. These lines were found among his effects after his death: "Never let it be said of O'Neill that he failed to empty a bottle. Ave atque vale [hail and farewell]." Shortly before his death, he had played the lead in a local theatrical production for the benefit of the local artists' colony.

References

External links
 
 Eugene O'Neill, Jr. Collection. Yale Collection of American Literature, Beinecke Rare Book and Manuscript Library.
 Last photograph taken of O'Neill

1910 births
1950 suicides
American classical scholars
Yale University alumni
Yale University faculty
Sarah Lawrence College faculty
The New School faculty
Suicides by sharp instrument in the United States
Suicides in New York (state)